Nature Plants is a monthly peer-reviewed online-only scientific journal covering all aspects of plants and plant biology. It was established in 2015 and is published by Nature Publishing Group.  The editor-in-chief is Chris Surridge. According to the Journal Citation Reports, the journal has a 2020 impact factor of 15.793.

References

External links

Publications established in 2015
Nature Research academic journals
Monthly journals
Online-only journals
English-language journals
Botany journals